Phebalium megaphyllum is a species of erect, rounded shrub that is endemic to Western Australia. It has glandular-warty branchlets, oblong to wedge-shaped leaves with a groove on the upper surface, and white flowers arranged in umbels of three to six on the ends of branchlets.

Description
The upper surface is glabrous with a central groove and the lower surface is covered with silvery scales and has a prominent, warty mid-vein. Flowering occurs from September to November.

Taxonomy
This phebalium was first formally described in 1907 by Alfred James Ewart who gave it the name Eriostemon tuberculosus var. megaphyllus and published the description in Proceedings of the Royal Society of Victoria. In 1998, Paul G. Wilson changed the name to Phebalium megaphyllum, publishing the change in the journal Nuytsia.

Distribution and habitat
Phebalium megaphyllum grows in scrub on undulating plains, ironstone hills and breakaways between Mullewa, Coolgardie and Ravensthorpe.

Conservation status
This phebalium is classified as "not threatened" by the Government of Western Australia Department of Parks and Wildlife.

References

megaphyllum
Flora of Western Australia
Plants described in 1907
Taxa named by Alfred James Ewart
Taxa named by Paul G. Wilson